Trigonotodus is an extinct genus of sharks, most likely belonging to the family Alopiidae. This genus includes three extinct species, which span from the early Eocene to the late Oligocene. It was originally placed in the family Otodontidae, but subsequently found to have affinities with Thresher sharks. This genus is sometimes considered part of the genus Alopias.  It is currently only known from isolated teeth.

Species
Species within this genera include:

References

Prehistoric Lamniformes
Prehistoric shark genera
Fish described in 1999